Betty Gofman (Rio de Janeiro, June 3, 1965) is a Brazilian stage, film, and television actress. Descended from Russian-Austrian Jews, she is married to philosopher Hugo Barreto, with whom she has two daughters, the twins Alice and Helena, and she is the sister of actress Rosane (Roxanne) Gofman.

Early years

Gofman was born in Rio de Janeiro. Her dream as a child was to be a veterinarian, and a protector of animals. With a theatrical training background, Gofman studied with Maria Clara Machado, and at Casa de Arte das Laranjeiras.

Career
When her sister, Roxanne, pursued an artistic career as an actress, Gofman decided to follow suit. She was only 20 years old when she was cast in the first version of the soap opera Ti Ti Ti (1985), and gained prominence with her character Monique in Selva de Pedra. Irreverent, she often performed in comedy roles. In Caminho das Índias, another soap opera on Brazilian TV, she made the audience laugh with her bumbling character Dayse. She participated in several soap operas and mini-series, among them Um Só Coração, produced by Rede Globo, where she played the painter Anita Malfatti. She also played a character in Cortina de Vidro by Walcyr Carrasco.

Her film debut was in Roberto Gervitz's Feliz Ano Velho released in 1987. She joined Bia Lessa's theatrical company and took part in several international theater festivals. Directed by Lessa, she acted in Everyday, based on the novel by Virginia Woolf, Ibsen's Casa de Bonecas, A Megera Domada, and Orlando.

Personal life 
By the end of the 1980s, she was in a relationship with musician Marcelo Fromer.

Filmography

Television

Films
 1987 - Os Trapalhões no Auto da Compadecida
 1987 - Feliz Ano Velho
 1989 - Kuarup
 1994 - Boca
 1999 - Até que a Vida nos Separe
 2000 - Cronicamente Inviável
 2000 - Amélia
 2003 - Viva Voz
 2003 - Oswaldo Cruz - O Médico do Brasil
 2003 - Eclipse.

Theater
 Orlando
 A Megera Domada
 Casa de Bonecas
 Cotidiano.
 A Vingança do Espelho: A história de Zezé Macedo

References

External links

1965 births
Living people
Actresses from Rio de Janeiro (city)
Brazilian stage actresses
Brazilian film actresses
Brazilian television actresses
Brazilian people of Russian-Jewish descent
Brazilian people of Austrian-Jewish descent